Molodyozhny, formerly known as Naro-Fominsk-5 is a closed urban locality (a settlement) in Moscow Oblast, Russia. Population:

Geography and transportation
It is surrounded by the territory of Naro-Fominsky District of Moscow Oblast. There is an automobile road to the village of Ateptsevo.

Administrative and municipal status
Within the framework of administrative divisions, it is incorporated as the closed administrative-territorial formation of Molodyozhny—an administrative unit with the status equal to that of the districts. As a municipal division, the closed administrative-territorial formation of Molodyozhny is incorporated as Molodyozhny Urban Okrug.

Military
It is used by the Strategic Missile Troops of Russia.

References

Notes

Sources

Urban-type settlements in Moscow Oblast
Closed cities